Intriago is a surname of Spanish origin. People with the surname include:

Álvaro Pérez Intriago (1936–2016), Ecuadorian politician
Alfredo Intriago (born 1970), Ecuadorian international referee
Francisco Ovidio Vera Intriago (1941–2014), Roman Catholic bishop
Jefferson Intriago (born 1996), Ecuadorian footballer